Farhanna "Sweet" Qismina Supandi, (Jawi: فرحانة قيسمينا سوڤندي) (born October 24, 1997) is a Malaysian actress. She is known for portraying Fasha in Hikayat Putera Syazlan and as Julie in Waktu Rehat.

Filmography

Film

Drama

Theater

Hosting

Discography

References

External links
 

Living people
1997 births
People from Muar
People from Johor
Malaysian people of Malay descent
Malaysian Muslims
Malaysian child actresses
Malaysian television actresses
21st-century Malaysian actresses